The LIU Sharks women's basketball team represents Long Island University in NCAA Division I basketball competition. They play their home games at their Brooklyn Campus in the Steinberg Wellness Center and are members of the Northeast Conference. Their current head coach is Rene Haynes, who was hired in April 2019.

The LIU Sharks are the result of the July 1, 2019 unification of the athletic departments which had previously represented two separate campuses of LIU, the Division I LIU Brooklyn Blackbirds and the Division II LIU Post Pioneers.

NCAA tournament results
As the Blackbirds, Long Island went to the NCAA Tournament once. Their record is 0-1.

References

External links
 Official website